Thyridia repens, with common names creeping monkeyflower, Native musk, Maori musk,  and native monkey flower, is a herbaceous succulent plant native to New Zealand and Australia that grows as low mats. Its flowers are light purple or white. It is the only species in the genus Thyridia.

Taxonomy
Thyridia is one of several genera that have been separated from an earlier concept of Mimulus as a large genus within family Phrymaceae.

References

Phrymaceae
Flora of Australia
Flora of New Zealand
Taxa named by William Robert Barker